Gant is a surname. Notable people with the surname include:

 Andrew Gant (born 1963), British composer, singer, author, teacher and politician
 Brian Gant (born 1952), Canadian retired soccer player
 Bruce Gant (born 1956), Canadian retired soccer player
 Cecil Gant (1913–1951), American blues singer and pianist
 Damon Gant (born 1952), fictional Los Angeles Police Chief from the game Phoenix Wright: Ace Attorney
 David Gant (born 1943),a Scottish actor and model
 Harry Gant (born 1940), American motorsport driver
 Jerry Gant (1963–2018), American Artist, poet, activist
 John Gant (born 1957), American bowler, rookie of the year 1984
 Kenneth Gant, former American football safety
 Olivia Gant (2010–2017), American female murder victim
 Ovidiu Ganț (born 1966), Romanian politician
 Richard Gant (born 1940), American actor
 Robert Gant (born 1968), American actor
 Ron Gant (born 1960), American professional baseball player
 William Gant (1919–1995), an associate justice of the Kentucky Court of Appeals